Caustic most commonly refers to:

 Causticity, the property of being able to corrode organic tissue
 Sodium hydroxide, sometimes called caustic soda
 Potassium hydroxide, sometimes called caustic potash
 Calcium oxide, sometimes called caustic lime

Caustic may also refer to:

 Caustic (band), an American industrial/powernoise band
 Caustic (mathematics), the envelope of rays reflected or refracted by a manifold
 Caustic (optics), optic phenomenon due to light rays reflecting/refracting through curved surfaces/objects
 Caustic Graphics, a graphics technology developer, part of Imagination Technologies
 Caustic Window, an alias of Aphex Twin (electronic musician Richard D. James)
 A playable character in the battle royale game Apex Legends